The Međimurje horse is an autochthonous medium-heavy horse breed of draught horse originating from Međimurje County in northernmost part of Croatia.

Characteristics

Compared with two other cold-blooded Croatian breeds, it is significantly taller and heavier than the Posavac horse (140–150 cm high) and closer in size to the Croatian Coldblood horse (150–160 cm). It has a relatively small head and small ears, short and strong neck, pronounced withers and powerful shoulders, well-developed chest and sturdy legs.

The dominant colours are bay and seal brown, followed by black, while the other ones are much more rare.

The temperament of the Međimurje horse is calm, even and affectionate, with good obedience and willingness to work, either to pull waggons or work in a field or forest. Following the introduction of machinery into agriculture, the breed has lost its importance though, and is being used increasingly for horsemeat production today.

As for its pure-breeding, the genetical analyses were made recently, using samples of mitochondrial DNA of a significant number of both Croatian and Hungarian population of the breed, as well as related breeds (Posavac horse, Croatian Coldblood horse, Noriker horse etc.), and showed that Međimurje horse is an autochthonous breed with origin linked to some other, mostly neighbouring, cold-blooded horse breeds.

History

The beginning of the breed dates back to the end of the 18th or the beginning of the 19th century, when it was started to crossbreed native mares (having Anglo-Arabian characteristics) with imported stallions of Noriker, Ardennes, Percheron and Brabant breeds. Since Međimurje County then administratively belonged to Hungarian Zala County (during the most of 19th century, except between 1848 and 1861), international professional literature frequently quoted that the Međimurje horse descended from Hungary.

Once widely spread over parts of the Habsburg monarchy – mostly in northern Croatia (besides Međimurje, there were significant populations in Zagorje, Podravina etc.), southwestern Hungary, eastern Slovenia and eastern Austria – the breed is endangered today, with a remaining small population of only around 40 individuals in its original area in Croatia, and a larger one on the north side of the Mura River in southwestern Hungary, as well as in eastern Slovenia.

See also

 Međimurje Horse Stud, Žabnik
 Croatian Coldblood
 Posavac horse
 List of horse breeds in DAD-IS
 List of mammals of Croatia

External links 
 Međimurje horse (with average height at the withers: 155-165 cm) in a brochure of State Institute for Nature Protection (in Croatian)
  Međimurje horse (Murinsulaner) – one of the native horse breeds of Croatia
 Exterior features of croatian autochthonous horse breeds (summary, in Croatian)
  Medžimurje horse - one of transboundary breeds in Croatia, Slovenia and Austria (from the workshop „Sub-regional and transboundary challenges and opportunities for gene banking“
 Phylogenetic analysis of Medjimurje horse
 Mitochondrial DNA evidence made by Faculty of agriculture - Laboratory of conservation genetics at University of Zagreb on web-pages of the European Federation of Animal Science (EAAP)

Horse breeds originating in Croatia
Horse breeds
Conservation Priority Breeds of the Livestock Conservancy